is the 14th single by Japanese idol girl group NMB48. It was released on April 27, 2016. It was number-one on the Oricon Weekly Singles Chart and ranked 9th with 281,513 copies sold in the first half year of 2016. It was also number-one on the Billboard Japan Hot 100.

The center position in the choreography for the title song is held by Sayaka Yamamoto.

Track listings

Type-A

Type-B

Type-C

Type-D

Theater Edition

Charts

Year-end charts

References

Further reading

External links 
 Discography on Official website 

2016 singles
2016 songs
Japanese-language songs
NMB48 songs
Songs with lyrics by Yasushi Akimoto
Oricon Weekly number-one singles
Billboard Japan Hot 100 number-one singles